Kenneth Ekman may refer to:
 Kenneth Ekman (ice hockey), Swedish ice hockey player
 Kenneth P. Ekman, United States Air Force general